The Tarkhan dynasty, was established by the a Tarkhan and ruled Sindh, Pakistan from 1554 to 1591 AD. General Mirza Isa Beg founded the Tarkhan dynasty in Sindh after the death of Shah Husayn Arghun of the Arghun dynasty.

The Mughal emperor Akbar annexed Sindh in 1591 after defeating the last Tarkhan ruler, who continued to rule as Governors for the Mughals.

Legacy
The Arghun rulers have their tombs at the Makli Necropolis.

Mirzas of Tarkhan dynasty

External links

|-

|-

See also
 List of Monarchs of Sindh

References

History of Sindh
1554 establishments in India